Paris, vu des hauteurs du Père Lachaise is a landscape painting made between 1842 and 1859 by Louise-Joséphine Sarazin de Belmont. The painting depicts Père Lachaise cemetery.

History
The artist gave this painting to the Musée des Augustins de Toulouse in 1859, in memory of Augustine Dufresne (1789–1842), widow of Antoine-Jean Gros.

It was shown in the 1994 exhibition Toulouse à l'époque romantique.

Description 
The foreground shows the family tombs of Gros and Dufresne. The Italianate aspect of the landscape is similar to landscapes made by the artist in Italy:

References 

 Catalogue raisonné des tableaux du musée de Toulouse, Toulouse, ed. Viguier, 1864
 Notice RO 256, official website of the musée des Augustins

French paintings
1850s paintings
Collections of the Musée des Augustins